Burnley College is a further education college based in Burnley, Lancashire. It is situated on Princess Way.

History
The college owes its origins to a Mechanics Institute.

In June 2022, the college made headlines after expelling student Leo Shepherd for making comments about Tony Blair and the Iraq war.

References

External links
 Official website

Buildings and structures in Burnley
Schools in Burnley
Further education colleges in Lancashire